Baxter House is a historic home located near Edom, Rockingham County, Virginia. The house dates to about 1775, and is a single pile, double-pen dwelling consisting of two abutted two-bay, two-story log structures set on limestone foundation.  It was built by Scottish settler George Baxter, whose son George A. Baxter served as president of Washington and Lee University from 1799 to 1829.

It was listed on the National Register of Historic Places in 1973.

References

Houses on the National Register of Historic Places in Virginia
Houses completed in 1775
Houses in Rockingham County, Virginia
National Register of Historic Places in Rockingham County, Virginia